George B. Chan (November 5, 1921 – March 27, 1998) was an American art director. He was nominated for an Academy Award in the category Best Art Direction for the film Gaily, Gaily.

Selected filmography 
 Gaily, Gaily (1969; co-nominated with Robert F. Boyle, Edward G. Boyle and Carl Biddiscombe)

References

External links 

1921 births
1998 deaths
Place of birth missing
Place of death missing
American art directors